National Highway 548C, commonly referred to as NH 548C is a national highway in  India. It is a spur road of National Highway 48. NH-548C traverses the states of Madhya Pradesh and Maharashtra in India.

Route 

Satara, Koregaon, Mhaswad, Malshiras, Akluj, Tembhurni, Kurudwadi, Barshi, Kuslamb, Yermala, Kalamb, Kaij, Dharur, Majalgaon, Partur, Watur, Mantha, Lonar, Mehkar, Janephal, Khamgaon, Shegaon, Akot, Anjangaon, Wadgaon, Paratwada, Baitul.

Junctions  

  Terminal near Satara.
  near Tembhurni.
  near Kuslamb , Barshi.
  near Yermala.
  near Kaij.
  near Majalgaon.
  near Mantha.
  near Mantha.
  near Mehkar.
  near Khamgaon.
  near Shegaon.
  near Patsul.
  near Akot.
  near Paratwada.
  Terminal near Betul.

See also 

 List of National Highways in India
 List of National Highways in India by state

References

External links 

 NH 548C on OpenStreetMap

National highways in India
National Highways in Maharashtra
National Highways in Madhya Pradesh